József Ács (born 1948) is a German composer, and classical pianist and composer of Hungarian origin. He is a graduate of the Franz Liszt Academy of Music in Budapest and the Robert Schumann Hochschule in Düsseldorf, he won the first prize for piano at the "German Music Competition" in the Beethovenhalle in Bonn. He is particularly renowned for his recitals of Franz Liszt, and has done work in conjunction with the Vatican Archives. More recently he has been performing the works of Italian composer Ruggero Leoncavallo. He composed a completion of Leoncavallo's Requiem which was a fragment. Ács also wrote a small mass for choir and organ called, "Weihnachtslieder-Messe." Appropriate for the Christmas season, this joyful mass incorporates two Christmas tunes, In dulci jubilo, and Es kommt ein Schiff geladen.

References

External links
 Übersicht der Werke list of works published by musica-con-spirito-edition.de

German male composers
German composers
German classical pianists
Male classical pianists
German classical organists
German male organists
1948 births
Living people
German people of Hungarian descent
German male pianists
21st-century classical pianists
21st-century organists
21st-century German male musicians
Male classical organists